Marcela Erbanová (born 20 May 1978 in Piešťany) is a Slovak sprint canoer who competed in the early to mid-2000s. Competing in two Summer Olympics, she earned her best finish of fifth in the K-1 500 m event at Athens in 2004.

References
 Sports-Reference.com profile

1978 births
Canoeists at the 2000 Summer Olympics
Canoeists at the 2004 Summer Olympics
Living people
Olympic canoeists of Slovakia
Slovak female canoeists
Sportspeople from Piešťany